In atmospheric radiation, Chandrasekhar's H-function appears as the solutions of problems involving scattering, introduced by the Indian American astrophysicist Subrahmanyan Chandrasekhar. The Chandrasekhar's H-function  defined in the interval , satisfies the following nonlinear integral equation

where the characteristic function  is an even polynomial in  satisfying the following condition

.

If the equality is satisfied in the above condition, it is called conservative case, otherwise non-conservative. An alternate form which would be more useful in calculating the H function numerically by iteration was derived by Chandrasekhar as,

 .

In conservative case, the above equation reduces to 

.

Approximation

The H function can be approximated up to an order  as

 

where  are the quadrature weights given by

Explicit solution in the complex plane
In complex variable  the H equation is 

 

where the imaginary part of the function  can vanish if  is real i.e., . Then we have

 

The above solution is unique and bounded in the interval  for conservative cases. In non-conservative cases, if the equation  admits the roots , then there is a further solution given by

Properties

.
.

and

See also
Chandrasekhar's X- and Y-function

External links

MATLAB function to calculate the H function https://www.mathworks.com/matlabcentral/fileexchange/29333-chandrasekhar-s-h-function

References

Special functions
Integral equations
Scattering
Scattering, absorption and radiative transfer (optics)